Michael Buthe (1 August 1944 – 15 November 1994) was a German artist who lived and worked between Germany and Morocco. He exhibited widely throughout Europe during his life and is known for his eclectic and prolific oeuvre which encompasses painting, sculpture, and installation.

Life and career
Michael Buthe was born on 1 August 1944 in Sonthofen in southern Germany to a Roman Catholic family. From 1964 to 1968, he studied at the Werkkunstschule, Kassel, now the Kunsthochschule Kassel. Thereafter he studied at Kunstakademie Düsseldorf as master student of Joseph Beuys. He began exhibiting in 1968, participating in Harald Szeeman’s landmark exhibition When Attitude Becomes Form: Live in Your Head at the Kunsthalle Bern the year after. Some of his most notable works during this time consisted of paintings made by cutting into the fabric and exposing the stretcher bars.

In the 1970s, Buthe began to travel extensively to Africa and the Middle East, most notably to Morocco where he took up extended residences in the cities of Essaouira and Marrakesh. His foreign stays heavily influenced his work, incorporating the sights and sounds of the countries he visited into his visual language. The experiences likewise spurned on engagements with spiritual and mythological elements in Buthes’ work.

Buthe likewise began to create installation works from the 1970s onward. In 1972, he attempted to bring Gnawa musicians to documenta 5, envisioning them performing in traditional tents. Given their minority status in Morocco—therefore lacking Moroccan passports—the musicians were barred from performing internationally. Though he was unable to fully realize this project, Buthe was galvanized to further develop his immersive, large-scale works.

Buthe was also a professor at the Kunstakademie Düsseldorf from 1983 until his death at the age of 50 in 1994. Amongst others, Klaus Girnus and Stefan Kürten were two of his master students. Despite enjoying success throughout Europe, he was relatively under-discussed amongst his contemporaries in America, but has come under recent re-examination with a number of posthumous solo and group exhibitions.

His work was well collected by museums both during his lifetime and in recent years. Significant representations of his work can be found in S.M.A.K - Stedelijk Museum voor Actguele Kunst, Ghent; Tate Britain, London; Centre Georges Pompidou, Paris; and Kolumba, the Art Museum of the Archdiocese of Cologne, as well as the Museum Ludwig, also in Cologne.

Selected exhibitions

Selected solo exhibitions 

 2016: Michael Buthe and Ingvild Goetz - A friendship, Sammlung Goetz, Munich
 2015-16: Michael Buthe, Kunstmuseum Luzern, Switzerland; S.M.A.K. - Stedelijk Museum voor Actuele Kunst, Ghent; Haus der Kunst, Munich
 2013: Secrets, Alexander and Bonin, New York
 2009: Michael Buthe: The Angel and His Shadow, Arp-Museum Bahnhof, Rolandseck
 1999: Michael Buthe: Frühe Zeichnungen, Collagen und Tagebücher, Kunsthalle Bielefeld
 1989: Primavera Pompeijana, Württembergischer Kunstverein, Stuttgart
 1985: Michel de la Sainte Beauté, Galerie Moderne Kunst Dietmar Werle, Cologne
 1980: Die endlose Reise der Bilder, Museum Folkwang, Essen, Germany	
 1975: Colonia, Agrippinensis, Babylonia, Africanus, Dei, Galerie Abis, Berlin
 1973: Le Dieux de Babylon, Kölnischer Kunstverein, Cologne; Kunstmuseum Luzern, Switzerland
 1971: Hommage an die Sonne, Galerie Toni Gerber, Bern, Switzerland

Selected group exhibitions 

 2014-15: Playing by heart, Kolumba, Cologne
 2012: La Triennale "Intense Proximity”, Palais de Tokyo and other venues, Paris
 2001: 70er Jahre, Kunstmusem Luzern, Switzerland
 1995: Auf Papier, Schirn Kunsthalle, Frankfurt
 1989: Refigured Painting – The German Image, Solomon R. Guggenheim Museum, New York
 1985: 1945-1985 Kunst in der Bundesrepublik Deutschland, Nationalgalerie Berlin
 1983-85: Sculpture from Germany (Organized by Independent Curators Inc.), San Francisco Museum of Modern Art; Sarah Campbell Blaffer Gallery, University of Houston; The Winnipeg Art Gallery; Art Gallery of Hamilton, Ontario; Archer M. Huntington Gallery, University of Texas, Austin; Queens Museum, New York
 1982: documenta 7, Kassel
 1982: Halle 6, Kampnagel-Fabrik Hamburg
 1977: documenta 6, Kassel
 1972: documenta 5, Kassel
 1970: Jetzt, Josef-Haubrich-Kunsthalle, Cologne
 1969: When Attitudes Become Form: Live in Your Head, Kunsthalle Bern; Museum Haus Lange, Krefeld; Institute of Contemporary Arts, London

Selected collections
 Kunstmuseum Bern
 FRAC - Pays de la Loire, Carquefou
 FRAC - Nord-Pas de Calais, Dunkerque
 Stiftung Museum Kunstpalast, Düsseldorf
 Städtische Galerie Erlangen
 S.M.A.K.- Stedelijk Museum voor Actuele Kunst, Ghent
 Museum Morsbroich Leverkusen
 Tate Britain, London
 Kunstmuseum Luzern
 Museum of Modern Art, New York
 Centre Georges Pompidou, Paris
 Museum der Stadt Ratingen
 Musée d’Art Moderne de Saint-Etienne
 FRAC - Rhône-Alpes, IAC - Institut d’Art Contemporain, Villeurbanne

Selected bibliography 
 Michael Buthe und Ingvild Goetz. ex. cat. with text by Ingvild Goetz, Udo Kier, Jürgen Klauke, Karsten Löckemann, Dominikus Müller, Marcel Odenbach, Ulrike Rosenbach, Antje von Graevenitz, Stephan von Wiese. Munich: Hatje Cantz and Sammlung Goetz, 2016 
 Michael Buthe Retrospective, ex. cat. with text by Fanni Fetzer, Philippe Van Cauteren, Okwui Enwezor, Martin Germann, Dominik Müller, Heinz Stahlhut, and Ulrich Wilmes. Kunstmuseum Luzern, S.M.A.K. Gent, Haus Der Kunst, Munich: Hatje Cantz Verlag, 2015 
 Franke, Marietta. Der Absurde Blick. Pieterlen: Peter Lang, 2010 
 Müller, Karsten. Michael Buthe: Der Engel und sein Schatten, ex. cat. Bielefeld: Kerber Verlag, 2009 
 Buthe: Michel de la Sainte Beauté, ex. cat. with text by Paolo Bianchi, Barbara Catoir, Sylvia Martin, Johannes Meinhardt, and Stephan von Wiese. Düsseldorf: Kunstmuseum Düsseldorf, 1999

References

External links 
 Buthe at Alexander and Bonin

1944 births
1994 deaths
People from Sonthofen
Fluxus
20th-century German painters
German male painters
Modern artists
Kunstakademie Düsseldorf alumni
Academic staff of Kunstakademie Düsseldorf
20th-century German sculptors
20th-century German male artists
German sculptors